Agyneta birulai is a species of sheet weaver found in Russia and China. It was described by Kulczyński in 1908.

References

birulai
Spiders of China
Spiders of Russia
Spiders described in 1908